Bärbel Wöckel ( Eckert; born 21 March 1955) is a former East German sprinter. She never ran a world record in the individual disciplines. However, she ran several world records as part of relay teams with Doris Maletzki, Renate Stecher and Christina Heinich over 4 x 100 meters, the last time on September 8, 1974, in Rome.
At the GDR Championships she took first place in the 4 x 100 meter relay in 1974, 1977, 1978, 1981 to 1984. In 1976 she won third place with the team. 
During this time she was in the state-organized doping program.

Biography
Wöckel won four Olympic gold medals between the 200 metres race and 4 × 100 metres relay, two each in the 1976 and 1980 Olympics. In each of those years, Wöckel placed first in the 200 m and 4 × 100 metres relay races.

She won a gold medal at the 1974 European Championships as the anchor of the 4 × 100 m relay, which set a world record of 42.50. She won the gold in the 200 m and as a part of the 4 × 100 m relay team as well as a silver in the 100 metres at the 1982 European Championships.

Bärbel Wöckel competed for the club SC Motor Jena during her active career.

Her rival, Marita Koch, complained in a letter that Bärbel received higher doses of steroids than her, because she had relatives in the company Jenapharm.

Awards Selection
 1974: Patriotic Order of Merit (German: Vaterländischer Verdienstorden, or VVO) in Bronze
 1976: Patriotic Order of Merit in silver
 1980 and 1984: Patriotic Order of Merit in gold
 2018: DLV-Ehrennadel in gold

See also
 German all-time top lists – 100 metres
 German all-time top lists – 200 metres
 List of multiple Olympic gold medalists

References

External links
 

1955 births
Living people
Athletes from Leipzig
East German female sprinters
Athletes (track and field) at the 1976 Summer Olympics
Athletes (track and field) at the 1980 Summer Olympics
Olympic athletes of East Germany
Olympic gold medalists for East Germany
Recipients of the Patriotic Order of Merit
European Athletics Championships medalists
Medalists at the 1980 Summer Olympics
Medalists at the 1976 Summer Olympics
Olympic gold medalists in athletics (track and field)
Olympic female sprinters
Friendship Games medalists in athletics